The following systems arose from earlier systems, and in many cases utilise parts of much older systems. For the most part they were used to varying degrees in the Middle Ages and surrounding time periods.  Some of these systems found their way into later systems, such as the Imperial system and even SI.

English system 
Before Roman units were reintroduced in 1066 by William the Conqueror, there was an Anglo-Saxon (Germanic) system of measure, of which few details survive. It probably included the following units of length:

 fingerbreadth or digit
 inch
 ell or cubit
 foot
 perch, used variously to measure length or area
 acre and acre's breadth
 furlong
 mile

The best-attested of these is the perch, which varied in length from 10 to 25 feet, with the most common value (16 feet or 5.03 m) remaining in use until the twentieth century.

Later development of the English system continued in 1215 in the Magna Carta. Standards were renewed in 1496, 1588 and 1758.

Some of these units would go on to be used in later Imperial units and in the US system, which are based on the English system from the 1700s.

Danish system 

From May 1, 1683, King Christian V of Denmark introduced an office to oversee weights and measures, a justervæsen, to be led by Ole Rømer. The definition of the alen was set to 2 Rhine feet. Rømer later discovered that differing standards for the Rhine foot existed, and in 1698 an iron Copenhagen standard was made. A pendulum definition for the foot was first suggested by Rømer, introduced in 1820, and changed in 1835. The metric system was introduced in 1907.

Length 

 skrupel – Scruple,  linie
 linie – Line,  tomme
 tomme – Inch,  fod
 palme – Palm, for circumference, 8.86 cm
 kvarter – Quarter,  alen
 fod – Defined as a Rheinfuss 31.407 cm from 1683, before that 31.41 cm with variations.
 alen – Forearm, 2 fod
 mil – Danish mile. Towards the end of the 17th century, Ole Rømer connected the mile to the circumference of the earth, and defined it as 12000 alen. This definition was adopted in 1816 as the Prussian Meile. The coordinated definition from  1835 was 7.532 km. Earlier, there were many variants, the most commonplace the Sjællandsk miil of 17600 fod or 11.130 km.

Volume 
 potte – Pot, from 1603  foot3
 smørtønde – Barrel of butter, defined as 136 potter from 1683
 korntønde – Barrel of corn, defined as 144 potter from 1683

Weight 
 pund – Pound, from 1683 the weight of  fot3 of water, 499.75 g

Miscellaneous 
 dusin – 12
 snes – 20
 gross – 144

Dutch system 

The Dutch system was not standardised until Napoleon introduced the metric system.  Different towns used measures with the same names but differing sizes.

Some common measures:

Length 
duim –2.54 cm
kleine palm –3 cm
grote palm –9.6 cm, after 1820, 10 cm
voet –12 duim = abt. 29.54 cm, many local variations
el – about 70 cm

Volume 
Pint – 0.6 L

Weight 
Ons, Once –  pond = 30.881 g
Pond (Amsterdam) – 494.09 g (other ponds were also in use)
Scheepslast – 4000 Amsterdam pond = 1976.4 kg = 2.1786 short tons

Finnish system 

In Finland, approximate measures derived from body parts and were used for a long time, some being later standardised for the purpose of commerce. Some Swedish, and later some Russian units have also been used.

Length 
vaaksa – The distance between the tips of little finger and thumb, when the fingers are fully extended.
kyynärä – c. 60 cm – The distance from the elbow to the fingertips.
syli – fathom, c. 180 cm – The distance between the fingertips of both hands when the arms are raised horizontally on the sides.
virsta – 2672 m (Swedish), 1068.84 m (Russian)
poronkusema – c. 7.5 km – The distance a reindeer walks between two spots it urinates on. This unit originates from Lapland (i.e. Sápmi).
peninkulma – 10.67 km – The distance a barking dog can be heard in still air.

Area 
tynnyrinala – 4936.5 m2 – The area (of field) that could be sown with one barrel of grain.

Volume 
kannu – 2.6172 L
kappa – 5.4961 L

Weight 
leiviskä – 8.5004 kg

Miscellaneous 
kortteli – 148 mm (length) or 0.327 L (volume)

French system 

In France, again, there were many local variants. For instance, the lieue could vary from 3.268 km in Beauce to 5.849 km in Provence. Between 1812 and 1839, many of the traditional units continued in metrified adaptations as the mesures usuelles.

In Paris, the redefinition in terms of metric units made 1 m = 443.296 ligne = 3 pied 11.296 ligne.

In Quebec, the surveys in French units were converted using the relationship 1 pied (of the French variety; the same word is used for English feet as well) = 12.789 inches (of English origin).  Thus a square arpent was 5299296.0804 in2 or about 36,801 ft2 or 0.8448 acre.

There were many local variations; the metric conversions below apply to the Quebec and Paris definitions.

Length 
 ligne –  pouce 2.2558 mm
 pouce – Inch,  pied  27.070 mm
 pied – Foot, varied through times, the Paris pied de roi is 324.84 mm.  Used by Coulomb in manuscripts relating to the inverse square law of electrostatic repulsion. Isaac Newton used the "Paris foot" in his Philosophiae Naturalis Principia Mathematica.
  1 Roman cubit = 444 mm (so 10000 Roman cubits = 4.44 km, a closer approximation to  degree)
 toise – Fathom, 6 pieds. Originally introduced by Charlemagne in 790, it is now considered to be 1.949 m.
 arpent – 30 toises or 180 pieds, 58.471 m
 lieue de poste – Legal league, 2000 toises, 3.898 km
 lieue metrique – Metric system adaptation, 4.000 km
 lieue commune – French land league, 4.452 km,  Equatorial degree
 lieue marine – French (late) sea league, 5.556 km, 3 nautical miles.

Area 
 arpent – square arpent, 900 square toises, 3419 m2

Volume 
 litron – 0.831018 litres

Weight 
 livre – 0.4895 kg
 quintal – 100 livres, 48.95 kg

German system 

Up to the introduction of the metric system, almost every town in Germany had their own definitions. It is said that by 1810, in Baden alone, there were 112 different Ellen.

Length 
 Linie – Line, usually  inch, but also .
 Zoll – Inch, usually  foot, but also .
 Fuss – Foot, varied between 23.51 cm in Wesel and 40.83 cm in Trier. 
 Rheinfuss – Rhine foot, used in the North, 31.387 cm
 Elle – Ell / cubit, distance between elbow and finger tip. In the North, often 2 feet, In Prussia  feet, in the South variable, often  feet. The smallest known German elle is 402.8 mm, the longest 811 mm.
 Klafter – Fathom, usually 6 feet. Regional changes from 1.75 m in Baden to 3 m in Switzerland.
 Rute – Rod, Roman origin, use as land measure. Very differing definitions, 10, 12, 14, 15, 18 or 20 feet, varied between approx. 3 and 5 m.
 Wegstunde – 'Way's hour', one hours travel (by foot), used up to the 18th century. In Germany  Meile or 3.71 km, in Switzerland 16000 feet or 4.8 km
 Meile – 'Mile', a German geographische Meile or Gemeine deutsche Meile was defined as 7.420 km, but there were a wealth of variants:
 Anhalt – 7532 m
 Baden – 8889 m before 1810, 8944 m before 1871, 8000 m thereafter
 Böhmen – 7498 m
 Brabant – 5000 m
 Bayern – 7415 m, connected to a  Equatorial degree as 25406 Bavarian feet.
 Hamburg (Prussia) – In 1816, king Frederick William III of Prussia adopted the Danish mile at 7532 m, or 24000 Prussian feet. Also known as Landmeile.
 Hessen-Kassel – 9206 m
 Lippe-Detmold – 9264 m
 Oldenburg – 9894 m
 Osnabrück – 5160 m
 Pfalz – 4630 m
 Rheinland – 4119 m
 Sachsen – Postmeile, 7500 m. Also 9062 m or 32000 feet in Dresden
 Schleswig-Holstein – 8803 m
 Westfalen – 11100 m, but also 9250 m
 Vienna – 7586 m
 Wiesbaden – 1000 m
 Württemberg – 7449 m
 Reichsmeile – 'Imperial / (The) Realm's mile', new mile when the metric system was introduced, 7.5 km. Prohibited by law in 1908. 
 Schainos – Uncertain use, between 10 and 12 km,
 Stadion – Uncertain use

Norwegian system 

Before 1541, there were no common definition for length measures in Norway, and local variants flourished. In 1541, an alen in Denmark and Norway was defined by law to be the Sjælland alen. Subsequently, the alen was defined by law as 2 Rhine feet from 1683. From 1824, the basic unit was defined as a fot being derived from astronomy as the length of a one-second pendulum times  at a latitude of 45°. The metric system was introduced in 1887.

Length 

 skrupel – Scruple,  linje or approx. 0.18 mm.
 linje – Line,  tomme or approx. 2.18 mm
 tomme – Thumb (inch),  fot, approx. 2.61 cm. This unit was commonly used for measuring timber until the 1970s. Nowadays, the word refers invariably to the Imperial inch, 2.54 cm.
 kvarter – Quarter,  alen.
 fot – Foot,  alen. From 1824, 31.374 cm. 
 alen – Forearm, 62.748 cm from 1824, 62.75 cm from 1683, 63.26 cm from 1541. Before that, local variants.
 favn – Fathom (pl. favner), 1.882 m.
 stang – Rod, 5 alen or 3.1375 m
 lås – 28.2 m
 steinkast – Stone's throw, perhaps 25 favner, used to this day as a very approximate measure.
 fjerdingsvei – Quarter mile, alt. fjerding,  mil, i.e. 2.82375 km.
 rast –Lit. "rest", the old name of the mil. A suitable distance between rests when walking. Believed to be approx. 9 km before 1541. 
 mil – Norwegian mile, spelled miil prior to 1862, 18000 alen or 11.295 km. Before 1683, a mil was defined as 17600 alen or 11.13 km. The unit survives to this day, but in a metric 10 km adaptation
 landmil – Old land-mile, 11.824 km.

Area 
 kvadrat rode – Square stang, 9.84 m2
 mål – 100 kvadrat rode, 984 m2. The unit survives to this day, but in a metric 1000 m2 adaptation.
 tønneland – "Barrel of land", 4 mål

Volume 
 skjeppe –  tønne, i.e. 17.4 L.
 tønne – Barrel, 139.2 L.
 favn – 1 alen by 1 favn by 1 favn, 2.232 m3, used for measuring firewood to this day.

Weight 
 ort – 0.9735 g
 merke – From Roman pound, (pl. merker), 249.4 g, 218.7 g before 1683.
 pund – Pound, alt. skålpund, 2 merker 0.4984 kg, was 0.46665 kg before 1683
 bismerpund – 12 pund, 5.9808 kg
 vette – 28.8 mark or 6.2985 kg.
 laup – alt. 'spann', used for butter, 17.93 kg (approx. 16.2 L).
 våg –  skippund, 17.9424 kg.
 skippund – Ships pound, 159.488 kg. Was defined as 151.16 kg in 1270.

Nautical 
 favn – Fathom (pl. favner), 3 alen, 1.88 m
 kabellengde – cable length, 100 favner, 185.2 m
 kvartmil – Quarter mile, 10 kabellengder, 1852 m
 sjømil – Sea mile, 4 kvartmil, 7408 m, defined as  Equatorial degree.

Monetary 
 skilling – Shilling, see riksdaler and speciedaler.
 ort – See riksdaler and speciedaler.
 riksdaler – Until 1813, Norwegian thaler. 1 riksdaler is 4 ort or 6 mark or 96 skilling.
 speciedaler – Since 1816. 1 speciedaler is 5 ort or 120 skilling. From 1876, 1 speciedaler is 4 kroner (Norwegian crown, NOK).

Miscellaneous
 tylft – 12, also dusin
 snes – 20
 stort hundre – Large hundred, 120 
 gross – 144

Portuguese system 
The various systems of weights and measures used in Portugal until the 19th century combine remote Roman influences with medieval influences from northern Europe and Islam.The Roman and northern European influences were more present in the north. The Islamic influence was more present in the south of the country.

The gradual long-term process of standardization of weights and measures in Portugal is documented mainly since the mid-14th century. In 1352, municipalities requested standardization in a parliament meeting. With advances, adjustments and setbacks, this framework predominated until the end of the 15th century.

Further information: Portuguese customary units.

Romanian system 

The measures of the old Romanian system varied greatly not only between the three Romanian states (Wallachia, Moldavia, Transylvania), but sometimes also inside the same country. The origin of some of the measures are the Latin (such as iugăr unit), Slavic (such as vadră unit) and Greek (such as dram unit) and Turkish (such as palmac unit) systems.

This system is no longer in use since the adoption of the metric system in 1864.

Length 
 Cot (cubit) – 0.664 cm (Moldavia); 0.637 cm (Wallachia)
 Deget (finger) – the width of a finger
 Palmac – 3.48 cm (Moldavia)
 Lat de palmă (palm width) –  palmă
 Palmă (palm) –  of a stânjen
 Picior (foot) –  of a stânjen
 Pas mic (small step) – 4 palme (Wallachia)
 Pas mare (large step) – 6 palme (Wallachia; Moldavia)
 Stânjen – 2 m (approximately)
 Prăjină – 3 stânjeni
 Funie (rope) – 20 – 120 m (depending on the place)
 Verstă – 1067 m
 Leghe (league) – 4.444 km; 
 Poştă – 8 – 20 km (depending on the country)

Area 
 Prăjină – 180–210 m2
 Feredelă –  pogon
 Pogon – 50000 m2
 Iugăr – the area ploughed in one day by two oxen 7166 m2 (Transylvania in 1517); 5700 m2 or 1600 square stânjeni (later)
 Falce – 14300 m2

Volume 
 Litră –  oca
 Oca – (pl. ocale), 1.5 litres (Moldavia); 1.25 litres (Wallachia)
 Pintă – 3.394 litres (Transylvania)
 Vadră – (pl. vedre, in Transylvania 'Tină), 10 ocale; 12.88 litres (Wallachia); 15 litres (Moldavia)
 Baniţă – 21.5 litres (Moldavia); 33.96 litres (Wallachia)
 Chiup – 30–40 litres (a chiup was a large clay pot for liquids)
 Obroc mic – 22 ocale Obroc mare – 44 ocale Merţă – 110–120 ocale (Moldavia); 22.5 litres (Transylvania)
 Giumătate – 80–100 vedre (poloboc) Feredelă –  bucket (Transylvania)
 Câblă – A bucket of wheat

 Weight 
 Dram – 3.18–3.25 g sau 3.22–3.80 cm3
 Font – 0.5 kg (Transylvania)

 Russian and Tatar systems 
See:
 Obsolete Russian weights and measures
 Obsolete Tatar weights and measures

 Scottish system 

 Length 
 inch – 2.554 cm
 foot – 12 inches, 30.645 cm
 ell – Elbow, 37 Scots inches. 94.5 cm
 fall – 18 Scots feet
 mile – 320 falls, 1814.2 m

 Spanish system 
There were several variants.  The Castilian is shown.

 Length 
 punto – Point,  línea línea – Line,  pulgada pulgada – Inch,  vara, 0.02322 m
 pie – Foot, 12 pulgadas, 0.2786 m
 vara – Yard, 0.8359 m
 paso – Pace, 60 pulgadas legua – League, 5000 varas, approx 4.2 km

 Swedish system 

In Sweden, a common system for weights and measures was introduced by law in 1665. Before that, there were a number of local variants. The system was slightly revised in 1735. In 1855, a decimal reform was instituted that defined a new Swedish inch as  foot. It did not last long, because the metric system was subsequently introduced in 1889. Up to the middle of the 19th century there was a death penalty for falsifying weights or measures.

 Length 
 linje – Line, after 1863  tum, 2.96 mm. Before that,  tum or 2.06 mm.
 tum – Thumb (inch), after 1863  fot, 2.96 cm. Before that,  fot or 2.474 cm.
 tvärhand – Hand, 4 inches.
 kvarter – Quarter,  aln fot – Foot,  aln. Before 1863, the Stockholm fot was the commonly accepted unit, at 29.69 cm.
 aln – Forearm (pl. alnar). After 1863, 59.37 cm. Before that, from 1605, 59.38 cm as defined by king Carl IX of Sweden in Norrköping 1604 based on the Rydaholmsalnen.
 famn – Fathom, 3 alnar.
 stång – 16 fot, for land measurement
 ref – 160 fot, for land measurement, was 100 fot after 1855.
 stenkast – Stone's throw, approx 50 m, used to this day as an approximate measure.
 fjärdingsväg –  mil skogsmil – Also rast, distance between rests in the woods, approx 5 km. 
 nymil – New mile from 1889, 10 km exactly. Commonly used to this day, normally referred to as mil.
 mil – Mile, also lantmil. From 1699, defined as a unity mile of 18000 aln or 10.69 km. The unified mile was meant to define the suitable distance between inns.
 kyndemil – The distance a torch will last, approx 16 km

 Area 
 kvadratfamn – square famn or 3.17 m2
 kannaland – 1000 fot2, or 88.15 m2
 kappland – 154.3 m2.
 spannland – 16 kappland tunneland – 2 spannland kvadratmil – square mil, 36 million square famnar, from 1739.

 Volume 
 pot – Pot (pl pottor), 0.966 L
 tunna – 2 spann ankare – Liquid measure, 39.26 L
 ohm – (alt. åm), 155 pottor skogsfamn – for firewood, 2.83 m3 = 6×6×3 fot storfamn – for firewood, 3.77 m3 = 8×6×3 fot kubikfamn – 5.65 m3 = 6×6×6 fot Weight 
 ort – 4.2508 g
 mark –  skålpund or 212.5 g. Used from the Viking era, when it was approx 203 g.
 skålpund – Pound, 0.42507 kg
 bismerpund – 12 skålpund, 5.101 kg.
 lispund – 20 skålpund skeppspund – Ships pound, 20 lispund or 170.03 kg.

 Nautical 
 kabellängd – Initially 100 famnar or 178 m. Later, a distansminut or  nautical mile.
 kvartmil – Quarter mile, 1852 m, identical to nautical mile.
 sjömil – Sea mile, 4 kvartmil, 7408 m

 Monetary 
 skilling – From 1776,  riksdaler õre – From 1534,  mark. Replaced by the skilling, but from 1855 reintroduced as  riksdaler.
 mark – From 1534,  daler. From 1604,  daler.
 daler – From 1534, Swedish thaler. From 1873, replaced by the krona (Swedish crown, SEK). 
 riksdaler – From 1624,  daler, from 1681 2 daler, from 1715 3 daler, from 1776 6 daler See also 
 Mesures usuelles
 Weights and measures

 References 

 Measure for Measure, Richard Young and Thomas Glover, .
 Masse und Gewichte, Marvin A. Powell
 The Weights and Measures of England, R. A. Connor 
 World Weights and Measures. Handbook for Statisticians, UN Department of Economic and Social Affairs
 Lexikon der Münzen, Maße, Gewichte, Zählarten und Zeitgrößen aller Länder der Erde, Richard Klimpert, 1896
 Grand dictionnaire universel du XIXe siècle, Pierre Larousse, 1874
 De gamle danske længdeenheder, N.E. Nørlund, 1944
 Mål og vægt, Poul Rasmussen, 1967.
 Med mått mätt - Svenska och utländska mått genom tiderna'', Albert Carlsson, .

External links 
 Extensive list of Dutch measures
 Dictionary of Units of Measurement
 Units of measure
 Unit systems
 Mile measurements
 Old units of measure
 English Customary Weights and Measures
 Alte Längenmaße und ihre Bedeutung
 Projekt zur Erschliessung historisch wertvoller Altkartenbestände
 Scandinavian units
 Swedish units

Units of measurement
Systems of units
Science in the Middle Ages

de:Alte Maße und Gewichte
sl:Stare uteži in mere